Michael "Mike" Doyle (born 8 September 1991) is a British-American football wide receiver and assistant coach for the Birmingham Bulls of the BAFA National Leagues (BAFANL). He debuted for the Bulls in 2013.

Early years
Doyle was born in Birmingham and lived in the area his whole life, attending King's Norton Boys' School. It was during his time at King's Norton Sixth Form that he began a brief career at a local Sports Direct store.

Football career
Doyle debuted for the Birmingham Bulls in 2013, after attending rookie camp in late 2012. Although he originally arrived as a tight end, he quickly switched to wide receiver. After making a strong impression in camp, he was named as a starter for the opening game, away to the newly promoted West Coast Trojans, where he was the only Bulls receiver to complete a catch. The Bulls came away as 3-0 winners. Doyle received no further passes in a year where the Bulls struggled to a 2-8 finish.

Doyle held onto his role as a starter going into 2014, despite a large rookie intake. As the season progressed, Doyle became known for difficult catches in tight windows, hauling in the ball in double coverage in a narrow defeat to the Lancashire Wolverines and securing the win over the Yorkshire Rams with a clutch catch in traffic on a vital third and long situation, allowing the Bulls to kneel out the rest of the clock.

In the very next game, against the Gateshead Senators, Doyle caught his first touchdown for the Bulls on a precise slant route. He made his longest reception weeks later against the Sheffield Predators, with a 35-yard catch and run.

During the 2015 season, Doyle doubled his touchdown record, with a 47-yard reception against the Ouse Valley Eagles, and got his first rushing touchdown on an "End-around" play during the 50-0 victory over the Cambridgeshire Cats.

Coaching
On August 26th, Doyle was named as an assistant wide receivers coach by newly appointed offensive coordinator Gary Hodgen, to work under wide receiver coach Jon McNulty. Doyle will continue to play for the Bulls.

Career statistics

Regular season

Postseason

Personal life 
Doyle lives in the Northfield suburb of Birmingham, and is also a qualified Personal Trainer.

References

External links 
 Official Twitter
 Hudl Page

Living people
1991 births
American football wide receivers
Sportspeople from Birmingham, West Midlands